The Bosch Parade is an annual celebration in the Netherlands in which creative artistic exhibits float by, sometimes including swimmers and acrobats and welders and singers and water sprayers. Floats are designed by professional artists and designers who collaborate with choreographers and composers and directors, and the final production requires many volunteers. The event is usually held during a few days each June. The artistic director is Miesjel van Gerwen. The celebration was named in honour of the 15th century Dutch painter Hieronymus Bosch. Guidelines include only minimal use of power or motors. It attracts thousands of visitors who watch from the banks of the river.

References

External links
 Bosch Parade YouTube video

Parades in the Netherlands
Annual events in the Netherlands
Summer events in the Netherlands